The second Sjahrir Cabinet was the third Indonesian cabinet and the second formed by Sutan Sjahrir. It served from March to June 1946.

Background
The first Sjahrir cabinet had been forced to resign by Tan Malaka and his opposition Struggle Front. President Sukarno then offered this group the chance to form a new government, but it was unable to do so principally because of fears from other members of the group that Tan Malaka would try to replace Sukarno. Sukarno, with the support of the Central Indonesian National Committee (KNIP), then asked Sjahrir to form a new cabinet. The KNIP asked Sjahrir to form a cabinet including a wider range of opinion. Sjahrir agreed on the condition he would have the greater say in the choice of members.

Composition
Ten of the members of the previous cabinet served in the new cabinet. It contained members from a range of political parties, but Sjahrir's group was still dominant.

Changes
Minister of Justice Soewandi resigned on 22 June 1946 and four days later Minister of Agriculture and Supplies Rasad lost his job when the ministry he headed was merged into the Ministry of Trade and Industry, which later became the Ministry of Welfare. Darmawan Mangoenkoesoemo was appointed Minister of Welfare and Saksono as Junior Minister of Welfare.

The end of the cabinet
The second Sjahrir cabinet fell because of the kidnapping of Sjahrir and Darmawan Mangoenkoesoemo on 27 June 1946 by soldiers commanded by General Sudarsono. Like other opposition forces, they believed the government had betrayed the ideal of total independence by negotiating with the Dutch and conceding de facto Dutch control over parts of Indonesia. The rest of the cabinet held a meeting chaired by Amir Sjarifuddin and proposed transferring all powers to Sukarno.  The president took control of the government by a decree issued on 28 June. This decree returned Indonesia to a presidential system and dissolved the cabinet.

References

 Kahin, George McTurnan (1952) Nationalism and Revolution in Indonesia Cornell University Press, 
 Ricklefs (1982), A History of Modern Indonesia, Macmillan Southeast Asian reprint,

Notes

Cabinets of Indonesia
Indonesian National Revolution
1946 establishments in Indonesia
1946 disestablishments in Indonesia
Cabinets established in 1946
Cabinets disestablished in 1946